Chrono des Nations – Les Herbiers Vendée is a single-day individual time trial road bicycle race held annually in October in Les Herbiers, Vendée, France. Since 2005, the race is organized as a 1.1 event on the UCI Europe Tour.

It was originally called Chrono des Herbiers but in 2006 the race merged with the now defunct Grand Prix des Nations to create the currently called Chrono des Nations.

Winners

Men

Elite

Under-23

Junior

Women

References

External links 
 

 
UCI Europe Tour races
Recurring sporting events established in 1982
1982 establishments in France
Cycle races in France
Women's road bicycle races